Veselé is a municipality and village in Děčín District in the Ústí nad Labem Region of the Czech Republic. It has about 400 inhabitants.

Administrative parts
The hamlet of Veselíčko 1. díl is an administrative part of Veselé.

References

Villages in Děčín District